The 1946 Star World Championship was held in Havana, Cuba in 1946.

Results

References
 
 

Star World Championships
1946 in sailing
Sailing competitions in Cuba
Sports competitions in Havana
1946 in Cuban sport